In the field of memetics, a metameme (or meta-meme) is defined as a meme about a meme. A metaphor or the idea of memetic engineering are, thus, metamemes. The concept of memes has been referred to as "The Metameme".  Some other metamemes of interest include the meme tolerance and memeplexes.

Initial definitions of meta memes and the lingo surrounding the phenomenon have seen a recent overhaul, as a new perspective is beginning to emerge due to heightened interest from researchers and companies alike.

Measuring social evolution
Metamemes may be used to measure the evolution of a given society. It has been proposed that the degree of consciousness a society has about the very memes that form it is correlated with how evolved that society is. The difficulties associated with measuring the "metamemetic content" of a given society, however, render that proposition impractical.

This can be viewed (to some extent) as a memetic approach to the American sociologist Gerhard Lenski's view that the more information a given society has, the more advanced it is.

See also
Meme
Memetics

References

External links
Definition - MetaMeme.org

Philosophy of mind